Don 2: The Game is an action-adventure video game developed by Gameshastra and published by Sony Computer Entertainment for the PlayStation 2 and PlayStation Portable. It is based on the film of the same name. The game was released only in India in February 2013. It is one of the last games released by Sony Computer Entertainment for the PlayStation 2 and PlayStation Portable.

Gameplay 
The gameplay of Don 2 focuses primarily on shooter style missions with stealth elements. The game includes twelve missions and four boss battles including Kuala Lumpur and Berlin.

References

External links
 Don 2 Game

2013 video games
Action video games
Gameshastra games
India-exclusive video games
Organized crime video games
PlayStation 2 games
PlayStation Portable games
Single-player video games
Third-person shooters
Video games based on films
Video games developed in India
Video games set in Berlin
Video games set in Malaysia